Anton Kosmač (born 14 December 1976) is a Slovenian long distance runner who specialises in the marathon. He competed in the men's marathon event at the 2016 Summer Olympics.

References

External links
 

1976 births
Living people
Slovenian male long-distance runners
Slovenian male marathon runners
Place of birth missing (living people)
Athletes (track and field) at the 2016 Summer Olympics
Olympic athletes of Slovenia